Edward Preston Mitchell III was an American football coach and college athletics administrator.  He served as the head football at Delaware State University for one season, in 1959, compiling a record of 1–7.  Mitchell came to Delaware State  in 1956 when he was appointed as athletic  director and head of the Department of Health and Physical Education.  He has previously been athletic director and head of the Department of Health and Physical Education at Fisk University for two years.  Mitchell earned a Bachelor of Arts degree at North Carolina College at Durham—now known as North Carolina Central University—and a Master of Arts degree and a Doctor of Philosophy degree at the University of Iowa.

Head coaching record

References

Year of birth missing
Year of death missing
Delaware State Hornets athletic directors
Delaware State Hornets football coaches
Delaware State University faculty
Fisk Bulldogs athletic directors
Fisk University faculty
North Carolina Central University alumni
University of Iowa alumni
African-American coaches of American football
African-American college athletic directors in the United States
20th-century African-American sportspeople